Manzariyeh (also Romanized as Manz̧arīyeh) is a city in the Central District of Shahreza County, Isfahan Province, Iran.  At the 2006 census, its population was 5,617, in 1,621 families.  
in 2012 total population was 10,000

References

Populated places in Shahreza County

Cities in Isfahan Province